Jesse Williams (born 18 May 2001) is a Trinidadian footballer who plays for Pittsburgh Riverhounds SC of the USL Championship and the Trinidad and Tobago national football team.

Career statistics

International

References

Living people
2001 births
Trinidad and Tobago footballers
Trinidad and Tobago expatriate footballers
Trinidad and Tobago international footballers
Association football defenders
Coleraine F.C. players
Expatriate association footballers in Northern Ireland
2021 CONCACAF Gold Cup players
Trinidad and Tobago expatriate sportspeople in the United Kingdom
Expatriate soccer players in the United States
Trinidad and Tobago expatriate sportspeople in the United States
Pittsburgh Riverhounds SC players
St. Ann's Rangers F.C. players